Paenibacillus polymyxa, also known as Bacillus polymyxa, is a Gram-positive bacterium capable of fixing nitrogen. It is found in soil, plant tissues, marine sediments and hot springs. It may have a role in forest ecosystems and potential future applications as a biofertilizer and biocontrol agent in agriculture.

Growth conditions
P. polymyxa can be grown in the laboratory on trypticase soy agar medium.

Applications

Agricultural use
P. polymyxa might have possible future applications as a soil inoculant in agriculture and horticulture. Biofilms of P. polymyxa growing on plant roots have been shown to produce exopolysaccharides which protect the plants from pathogens. The interactions between this bacterial species and plant roots also cause the root hairs to undergo physical changes.

Antibiotics
Some strains of P. polymyxa produce antibiotics including fusaricidin and polymyxins. P. polymyxa var. colistinus produces the antibiotic colistin. 

Surfactant complexes isolated from P. polymyxa have been shown to be effective in disrupting biofilms of Bacillus subtilis, Micrococcus luteus, Pseudomonas aeruginosa, Staphylococcus aureus and Streptococcus bovis.

Cell extraction
P. polymyxa is a source of dispase, an enzyme used to isolate cells from animal tissues.

References

External links
 UniProt Taxonomy
 PATRIC: Paenibacillus polymyxa
Type strain of Paenibacillus polymyxa at BacDive -  the Bacterial Diversity Metadatabase

Paenibacillaceae
Bacteria described in 1994